Niger made its Paralympic Games début at the 2004 Summer Paralympics in Athens. It was represented by a single athlete, male sprinter Zoubeirou Issaka, who competed in the 100m race, in the T12 category for the nearly blind. His time of 13.90 was the slowest overall in the heats, ending his participation in the Games.

In 2008, Niger was represented only by male powerlifter Zakari Amadou, in the up to 67.5 kg category. He lifted 110 kg, ranking 13th and last of those who successfully lifted a weight.

Niger has never taken part in the Winter Paralympics.

Niger will be taking part in the 2012 Summer Paralympics, and the Fédération Nigérienne des Sports Paralympiques have chosen Bedford as the UK training base for its Paralympians.

Full results for Niger at the Paralympics

See also
 Niger at the Olympics

References